The Government of the 20th Dáil or the 14th Government of Ireland (14 March 1973 – 5 July 1977) was the government of Ireland formed after the 1973 general election held on 28 February 1973. It was a coalition government of Fine Gael and the Labour Party, known as the National Coalition, led by Liam Cosgrave as Taoiseach with Brendan Corish as Tánaiste. It was the first time either of the parties had been in government since the Government of the 15th Dáil (1954–57), when they were in coalition with Clann na Talmhan.

The 14th Government lasted for  days. The government was widely referred to as the "cabinet of all the talents".

14th Government of Ireland

Nomination of Taoiseach
The 20th Dáil first met on 14 March 1973. In the debate on the nomination of Taoiseach, Fianna Fáil leader and outgoing Taoiseach Jack Lynch, and Fine Gael leader Liam Cosgrave were both proposed. The nomination of Lynch was defeated with 69 votes in favour to 73 against, while the nomination of Cosgrave was carried with 72 in favour and 70 against. Cosgrave was appointed as Taoiseach by President Éamon de Valera.

Members of the Government
After his appointment as Taoiseach by the president, Liam Cosgrave proposed the members of the government and they were approved by the Dáil. They were appointed by the president on the same day.

Changes to departments

Attorney General
On 14 March 1973, Declan Costello SC was appointed by the president as Attorney General on the nomination of the Taoiseach. On 19 May 1977, Costello resigned as Attorney General on his nomination by the government for appointment as a judge of the High Court and John M. Kelly SC was appointed as Attorney General.

Parliamentary Secretaries
On 14 March 1973, the Government appointed Parliamentary Secretaries on the nomination of the Taoiseach.

Actions of the government
The National Coalition restricted the power of the National Council for Educational Awards. This forced the National Institute for Higher Education, Limerick and Thomond College of Education, Limerick to apply to the National University of Ireland for the conferring of degrees and diplomas. It removed the requirement that Irish be passed to obtain a Leaving Certificate; it also reformed the civil service by removing the requirement of knowledge in Irish and the mandatory retirement on marriage that many women faced during their civil service careers.

In response to the assassination of the British Ambassador to Ireland Christopher Ewart-Biggs by the Provisional IRA on 21 July, Cosgrave introduced a motion to declare a national emergency under Article 28.3.3º of the Constitution of Ireland created by an armed conflict. This was approved by the Dáil on 1 September by a vote of 70 to 65. This was followed by the introduction of the Emergency Powers Bill 1976.

President Cearbhall Ó Dálaigh referred the Emergency Powers Bill to the Supreme Court. Minister of Defence Paddy Donegan described the president as a "thundering disgrace" for this decision. The Minister apologised and privately offered to resign. Cosgrave refused to accept his resignation. On 21 October, Fianna Fáil proposed a motion in the Dáil calling on the minister to resign, which was defeated. Ó Dálaigh viewed the refusal to remove the Minister was an affront to his office by the Government and resigned on 22 October 1976. The following week, Fianna Fáil proposed a motion of no confidence in the government. This was countered by a motion of confidence in the government proposed by Cosgrave, which was carried on a vote of 73 to 67. The controversy caused severe damage to the image of the government.

See also
Dáil Éireann
Constitution of Ireland
Politics of the Republic of Ireland

References

Coalition governments of Ireland
Governments of Ireland
1973 establishments in Ireland
1977 disestablishments in Ireland
Cabinets established in 1973
Cabinets disestablished in 1977
20th Dáil